The Liard Plateau is a plateau in far northern British Columbia, Canada, located between the Smith and Liard Rivers, and extending north into the Yukon.

See also
List of physiogeographic regions of British Columbia
Geography of British Columbia
Liard Plain

References

Plateaus of British Columbia
Liard Country
Landforms of Yukon